Baudhacharya Shanti Swaroop Baudh (2 October 1949 – 6 June 2020) was an Indian writer, Buddhist scholar, painter, publisher and Pali language expert. He was an Ambedkarite-Buddhist activist. He was born in 1949 at Old Delhi in a Jatav Dalit family. In 1975, he set up Samyak Prakashan, a publishing house dedicated to Ambedkarite, Navayana Buddhist, Pali literature and Dalit literature.  Samyak Prakashan has published over 2000 books many of which have been translated into some 14 different languages including English, Sinhalese, Nepalese, Burmese. He was a board of editors member of Dhamma Darpan and Dalit Dastak magazines. He was Delhi state president of Buddhist Society of India.

Life 
Shanti Swaroop Bauddh's name 'Shanti Swaroop' was given by B. R. Ambedkar himself. Shanti Swaroop Bauddh's grandfather Chaudhary Devidas had been associated with Dr. Babasaheb Ambedkar since 1942. Shanti Swaroop Bauddh was born on 2 October 1949, when his name was kept to Gulab Singh. On 4 October 1949, Babasaheb Ambedkar suggested to change the name from Gulab Singh to Shanti Swaroop. At the suggestion of Ambedkar, Chaudhary changed the name of his grandson from Gulab Singh to Shanti Swaroop. After Dr. Babasaheb Ambedkar's initiation into Buddhism, Shanti Swaroop accepted 'Buaddh' (बौद्ध, also transliterated as Buadh) name as his surname. He became a Buddhist inspired by Ambedkar.

Shanti Swaroop Buaddh inherited the Ambedkarite movement from his grandfather Chaudhary Devidas and father Lala Harichand Maurya. His father Lala Harichandra Maurya was a participant in the Ambedkarite movement. Therefore, he was associated with the Ambedkarite movement from his student days. While studying in college, he wrote on Dr. Babasaheb Ambedkar, Buddhism and social issues.

In college days, Shanti Swaroop Buaddh was involved in the 1964 nationwide landless satyagraha movement. After completing his college education, he became active in the Republican Party of India. He has been active in the Buddhist Society of India in the Delhi region since 1970. From 1971 to 1973, he was the president of the Republican Party of India's Delhi region. He was instrumental in the development of the Dr. Babasaheb Ambedkar Bhavan of Delhi. He decided to quit his job as a Gazetted Officer of the government and spread Ambedkar's philosophy i.e. Ambedkarism.

List of works
Shanti Swaroop Baudh wrote 75 books in Hindi, and 43 books in English. His books have been translated in many languages including Marathi, Punjabi, Burmi, Thai etc.

Hindi books
 Jyotiba Phule Ki Amar Kahani
 Mang-Matang Jati Ke Aadi Purush : Kosalraj Prasenjeet (2018)
 Maharaja Jayachand Gaddar Nahi, Param Deshbhakt Bauddha Raja The (2016) 
Dhammapada Gatha Aur Katha
Dr. Babasaheb Ambedkar Ki Sangharsh Yatra Aur Sandesh

English books 
 Uttra Nandmata
 Angulimal
 Ananda
 Vishaka
 Mahamaya
 Mahapajapati Gotami
 Cinca
 Upali
 Kisa Gotmi
 Anathpindik
 Suddhodhan
 In The Foot - Step of Buddha
 Pictorial Life of Sakymuni
 Bodhgaya
 Buddha Coloring Book-1
 Buddha Coloring Book-2
 Babasaheb : As I Know Him
 Edwin Arnold On Bodhgaya
 Ramabai Ambedkar
 Dr. Ambedkar Speaks
 Ratthapala
 Kalandaknivapa
 Uppalavanna
 Khujjuttara
 Prakriti : The Candala Maiden
 Yasodhara
 Ambapali
 Bhadra Kundal Kesa
 Khema : The wise one
 Patacara : The Sanghnayika
 Devdatta
 Jeevak
 Suneet
 Purna Thera
 Vidudabha
 Bandhulla Malla
 Vessantara : The Generous One
 Seniya Bimbisar
 Bhagwaan Buddha
 Dhamma Senapati Sariputta
 Sarnath: The Great Holy Place of Buddhists
 Sujata
 Rahula Buddha

Other
 Goddess English painting

See also
 List of modern scholars in Buddhist studies
 Bhadant Anand Kausalyayan
 Dalit literature
 Navayana (publishing house)

References

External links
 Shanti Swaroop Baudh at Samyak Prakashan

1949 births
2020 deaths
20th-century Buddhists
21st-century Buddhists
Hindi-language writers
Hindi-language literature
Buddhist writers
Buddhist studies scholars
Dalit writers
Dalit literature
Indian scholars of Buddhism
Writers from Delhi
Indian magazine founders
Indian magazine editors